Nicola Vincenzo "Nicky" Crane (21 May 1958 – 7 December 1993) was an English neo-Nazi activist. He came out as gay before dying from an AIDS-related illness in 1993.

Neo-Nazism

Nicky Crane joined the British Movement (BM) in the late 1970s, and by 1980, he had become the BM organiser for Kent. In 1980, he attacked a black family at a bus stop near Liverpool Street station. For this act, he was convicted of unlawfully fighting and making an affray, and given a suspended sentence. Crane appeared on several T-shirts and calendars produced by the Aldgate skinhead shop The Last Resort during the 1980s. In 1981, he appeared on the cover of the Oi! compilation album Strength Thru Oi! (due to his skinhead appearance, not his racist views), with his Nazi tattoos partially airbrushed out. Garry Bushell, who chose the image, later said: "I had a Christmas card on the wall, it had that image that was on the cover of Strength Thru Oi!, but washed out. I honestly, hand on my heart, thought it was a still from The Wanderers. It was only when the album came through for me to approve the artwork that I saw his tattoos. Of course, if I hadn't been impatient, I would have said, right, fucking scrap this, let's shoot something else entirely. Instead, we airbrushed the tattoos out. There were two mistakes there, both mine. Hands up." The album was "hastily withdrawn" by Decca Records when Crane's identity and previous convictions were made public, and has since become very collectable.

Also in 1981, Crane was convicted and jailed for four years for his role in a BM-organised  attack on a group of black youths arriving on a train at Woolwich Arsenal railway station in 1980. He once led an attack on an anti-racist concert being held in Jubilee Gardens in London. Pictures of him storming the stage where singer Hank Wangford was performing appeared in national newspapers; although Crane was clearly identifiable, no action was taken. Released from jail in 1984, Crane soon began providing security for the white power skinhead band Skrewdriver, and remained associated with the band and its leader, Ian Stuart Donaldson, for the rest of the decade, designing two of the band's album covers and writing the lyrics for the song "Justice" on the LP Hail the New Dawn. He was jailed again in 1986 for six months following a fight on an Underground train. In 1987, he was instrumental in setting up the neo-Nazi network Blood and Honour with Donaldson.

Homosexuality
Crane was leading a double life as a homosexual, even serving as a steward at the London gay pride march in 1986. He was a regular at London gay clubs such as Heaven, Bolts and the Bell pub. At various times, Crane had worked as a bin man, bicycle courier, and a doorman at an S&M club. He worked for the protection agency Gentle Touch, and was able to shrug off any connection with the London gay scene as just part of his security work.  He also appeared in the Psychic TV music video for Unclean, and in amateur gay porn films while still a neo-Nazi activist.

In 1992, Crane admitted his homosexuality in a segment of the Channel 4 magazine show Out titled "Skin Complex". On the programme, broadcast on 29 July 1992, Crane and various other homosexuals explained why they were attracted to the skinhead scene. He was immediately disowned by his Nazi associates, including Ian Stuart Donaldson, who said: "I feel more betrayed by him than anybody else. It just goes to show that nationalism and homosexuality do not fit together, because nationalism is a true cause and homosexuality is a perversion." The same month, the UK newspaper The Sun ran an article on him entitled "Nazi Nick is a Panzi", and included a picture of Crane with his face snarling at camera, head shaved bald, braces worn over his bare torso, faded jeans, white-laced boots and brandishing an axe. Crane died from an AIDS-related illness 18 months later.

Crane's homosexuality is a central theme of Max Schaefer's 2010 novel, Children of the Sun, which follows James, a budding screenwriter in 2003 who becomes obsessed with the now deceased Crane.

See also 
 Michael Kühnen

Footnotes

External links
The Strange Case of Nicola Vincenzio Crane

1958 births
1993 deaths
20th-century English criminals
20th-century English male actors
20th-century English LGBT people
AIDS-related deaths in England
English neo-Nazis
English people of Italian descent
English actors in gay pornographic films
English gay actors
Gay pornographic film actors
LGBT conservatism
Male actors from Kent